Dongyuan may refer to the following locations in China:

Dongyuan County (东源县), Heyuan, Guangdong
Dongyuan railway station (东园站), station on the Beijing–Baotou Railway in Beijing
Dongyuan (Hebei), a former town in Zhengding County, Hebei
Dongyuan, Zhejiang (东源镇), town in Qingtian County
Dongyuan Subdistrict, Shijiazhuang (东苑街道), in Yuhua District, Shijiazhuang, Hebei
Dongyuan Subdistrict, Harbin (东原街道), in Daowai District, Harbin, Heilongjiang
Dongyuan Subdistrict, Fuxin (东苑街道), in Xihe District, Fuxin, Liaoning

See also
 Dong Yuan ( – ), Chinese painter